The Hustle Is On is the second album released by Core. The album was produced and mixed by Core. Tracks 1, 2, 4, 5, and 7 were recorded at Sub Sound and engineered by Stacey "Springdale" Phelon (engineer on Monster Magnet's first album Spine of God). The other tracks were recorded at Trax East with Eric Rachell. It was mastered at West Side Music by Al Douches.

The album mixes stoner, psychedelic rock, punk and jazz, and contains several instrumental tracks.

Track listing

All songs written by Core.

"The Monolith Problem" - 5:49
"Supernumber" - 4:49
"LD.5°" - 1:05
"Fleetwood" - 2:31
"Sarah's Curious Accident" - 4:17
"No.5 in a Series" - 0:47
"Vacuum Life" - 3:20
"Square and Round" - 3:50
"Skinny Legs and All" - 1:44
"(Untitled)" - 0:51
"Bicycle and Tricycle" - 4:41
"Edge City" - 6:08
"Blues for Gus (AuH2O)" - 15:24

Credits

 Tim Ryan - percussion
 Carmine Pernini - basses
 Finn Ryan - guitars/vocals
(Other instruments played by Core - acoustic guitar, acoustic bass)

Cultural references
The album begins with the "Monolith" sound of the science fiction film 2001: A Space Odyssey by Stanley Kubrick.

The last track's name features "AuH2O" which means goldwater (Au=gold, =water).

1999 albums
Core (band) albums
Tee Pee Records albums